Deanna Nicole "Tweety" Nolan (born August 25, 1979) is an American-Russian professional basketball player for UMMC Ekaterinburg of the Russian Premier League as well as the Russia women's national basketball team. Her primary position is shooting guard, but occasionally plays the point guard position. Her original name was Deana, but was legally changed to Deanna in 2000. She went to Flint Northern High School where she graduated and took that school state to state champs.

Early life
Nolan is the daughter of the late Phillip Murphy and Virginia Nolan. She has 1 older brother Omar, 1 younger brother Christopher, and 1 older sister Lekia. She lost her father 2 days before her first birthday.

High school years
Nolan attended Flint Northern High School where she led her team to back to back Michigan state championships in 1994 and 1995, and was crowned as Michigan's 1995 Miss Basketball.

Trivia
Her favorite basketball players are Allen Iverson, LeBron James, and Russell Westbrook.

College years
Nolan graduated in December 2001 with a degree in child and family development from the University of Georgia.  Overall, she helped the Lady Bulldogs achieve an 86–12 record overall during her collegiate career.

As a senior, Nolan earned 2001 All-SEC Tournament Team honors.

WNBA career
In the 2001 WNBA Draft, Nolan was selected by her home state team, Detroit Shock in the first round (sixth overall).  She has been nicknamed "Tweety", and is well known by fans for her amazing vertical leap.

Nolan also helped the Detroit Shock win their first championship in 2003. In 2006, she won another championship with Detroit and was named MVP of the 2006 WNBA Finals.

In 2008, she helped the Shock win their third WNBA Championship. In 2007, 2008 and 2009, she was named the Detroit Shock Player of the Year in voting by members of the Detroit Sports Broadcasters Association.

International career
In the 2007–08, 2008–09, 2009–10 and 2012–13 WNBA off seasons, she played for the UMMC Ekaterinburg club in Russia.

She obtained a Russian passport in order to not count against the team's allowed number of foreign players. She stated during 2008 that she hoped to play for the Russian Olympic team, but was passed over in favor of Becky Hammon.

Notes

External links
WNBA Player Profile
June 28, 2005 WNBA chat transcript
December 25, 2005 WNBA chat transcript

1979 births
Living people
African-American basketball players
American women's basketball players
American expatriate basketball people in Russia
Basketball players from Flint, Michigan
Detroit Shock players
Georgia Lady Bulldogs basketball players
LGBT basketball players
LGBT people from Michigan
Lesbian sportswomen
Naturalised citizens of Russia
Russian people of African-American descent
Olympic basketball players of Russia
Point guards
Russian women's basketball players
Women's National Basketball Association All-Stars
21st-century African-American sportspeople
21st-century African-American women
20th-century African-American sportspeople
20th-century African-American women
20th-century African-American people
United States women's national basketball team players